Lord Giveth, Lord Taketh Away is a collaborative EP by American rapper Freddie Gibbs and producer Statik Selektah. It was released on June 24, 2011, by Showoff Records and CTE World.

Background
Freddie Gibbs recorded the mixtape in 24 hours with DJ Statik Selektah in a studio in Brooklyn, New York.

Critical reception
In a review for Pitchfork, critic reviewer Tom Breihan wrote: "Lord Giveth remains a solid showcase for one of our most solid rappers." At HipHopDX, Luke Gibson explained: "Lord Giveth, Lord Taketh Away'' is an inspired project from two of Hip Hop’s most heralded. For Gibbs it builds upon the foundation that his mixtape grind has created."

Track listing 
All tracks are produced by Statik Selektah

References

External links
 
 

2011 EPs
Freddie Gibbs albums
Statik Selektah albums
Albums produced by Statik Selektah